French Bronze is a form of bronze typically consisting of 91% copper, 2% tin, 6% zinc, and 1% lead.

Other uses
The term French bronze was also used in connection with cheap zinc statuettes and other articles, which were finished to resemble real bronze, and some older texts call the faux-bronze finish itself "French bronze". Its composition was typically 5 parts hematite powder to 8 parts lead oxide, formed into a paste with spirits of wine. Variations in tint could be obtained by varying the proportions. The preparation was applied to the article to be bronzed with a soft brush, then polished with a hard brush after it had dried.

Notes

Bronze
Brass
Copper alloys